Macomber may refer to:

People
Bart Macomber (1894–1971), American college football player
Debbie Macomber (b. 1948), American author of romance novels
Eleanor Macomber (1801–1840), American missionary, teacher
John D. Macomber (b. 1928), American businessman, President of the Export-Import Bank of the United States 1989–92
Joshua Mason Macomber (1811–1881), American educator and physician

Other uses
Macomber, West Virginia
Macomber High School (Toledo, Ohio) a former public vocational school in Toledo, Ohio

See also
Eisner v. Macomber, a 1920 decision by the United States Supreme Court